Aaron Leo Brody (August 23, 1930 – July 26, 2021) was an American food scientist, who developed new technologies in food processing and packaging. He created the first frozen fish sticks in the 1950s. Later, Brody served as an adjunct professor at the University of Georgia.

Biography

Early years
Aaron Leo Brody was born in Boston, Massachusetts, the elder of two children to Nathan Brozozek and Lillian Gorman, Jewish immigrants from Poland. Upon entry into America through Ellis Island, his father's name was Americanized to Brody. Aaron attended Solomon-Lewenburgh Junior High School and then Boston English School in 1947.

Brody entered Massachusetts Institute of Technology (MIT) in 1947, and earned a B.S. in Food Technology in 1951. He became an illustrator with contributions to the school newspaper where most of his work was pen on paper of sports figures. He was drafted into the Korean War and served from 1952 to 1954. He was based at Fort Pickett in Blackstone, Virginia where he was a newspaper correspondent reporting on the personal stories of wounded soldiers returning from the War.

After completing his military commitment, he entered the graduate program of the Food Packaging Department at MIT where he earned a Ph.D. in 1957. Brody studied under Bernard E. Proctor, an American food scientist involved in early research of food irradiation, and the MIT Food Technology Department Chair. Brody's "Masticatory Properties of Foods by the Strain Gage Denture Tenderometer", was one of the many contributions he made to the world of food technology. The invention was featured in Life (magazine) on October 29, 1956, and included a full page of pictures of the machine which was shown chewing a piece of mozzarella cheese. The device is on display at the MIT Museum. The mechanism allowed food manufacturers to control qualities in process and design future food products with specific properties. He later earned an M.B.A. from Northeastern University in 1970.

Career
Brody started his career, while in school, in food technology with the Birdseye Fisheries Lab Division of General Foods in 1951 as a team member in the development of the first frozen precooked foods including fish sticks. While a graduate student, he worked part-time for Raytheon Manufacturing Company where he was a member of a team that developed the first microwave oven, leading to microwave cooking, heating, and browning of foods. After he earned his graduate degree, Brody worked for the Whirlpool Corporation in Benton Harbor, Michigan. He led the development of modified atmosphere packaging (MAP), invented an odor control system for refrigerators, a thermoelectric refrigerator/freezer, the Total Environmental Control “Tectrol” controlled atmosphere process for food preservation, a progenitor of MAP fresh-cut vegetables, and radiation pasteurization of foods. While at Whirlpool, he invented and patented an apparatus and method of storing perishable animal and plant materials, as well as non-food materials.

He developed commercial confectionery products including Starburst and Pop Rocks while employed at M&M Candies Division of Mars, Inc. At Mead Packaging, he invented the Crosscheck Aseptic Packaging System for high acid fluid food products used commercially for juices and sauces, receiving patents US4,152,464, US4,391,080, US4,409,775. At Container Corporation of America, he led the development of the Versaform insert injection molding system, and he was Marketing Development Manager, which was his last position in corporate America.

By the mid 1980s, Brody transitioned into an independent consultant and college professor. He has taught undergraduate and graduate food packaging and food product development and marketing courses at The University of Georgia, MBA strategic marketing and product development courses at Saint Joseph's University, and packaging courses at Michigan State University. Brody authored numerous articles and ten textbooks in food packaging and food technology, marketing, and packaging. He authored The Encyclopedia of Packaging Technology that covers technologies used to package consumer and industrial products across industries from food to automobiles, soft drinks to pharmaceuticals. He also authored Modified Atmosphere Packaging for Fresh-Cut Fruits and Vegetables that covers modern MAP technologies for fresh-cut fruits.

Family
Aaron Brody married Carolyn Goldstein on April 11, 1953, and stayed married until her death in April 2021. They had three children. He died on July 26, 2021, of Congestive Heart Failure.

Honors
In 1964, Brody was awarded the Industrial Achievement Award by the Institute of Food Technologists and the Leadership Award by the Packaging Institute. He was named Packaging Man of the Year in 1985 by the National Association of Packaging, Handling, and Logistics Engineers. The Institute of Food Technologists' Food Packaging Division gave Brody the highest industry award, the Riester-Davis Award for Lifetime Achievement in Food Packaging, in 1988. He was the first recipient of the Institute of Food Technologists' Industrial Scientist Award in 1994 for scientists who made technical contributions to advancing the food industry.

In 1995, Brody was inducted into the Packaging Hall of Fame. In 2000, he was awarded the Nicholas Appert Award by the Institute of Food Technologists in recognition of his lifetime contributions.

The Michigan State School of Packaging established the Annual Aaron Brody Distinguished Lecture In Food Packaging in perpetuity. This is an endowment that was created by family and friends of Aaron L. Brody and Carolyn Brody in recognition of Aaron's lifelong achievements in Food Packaging. The Food Packaging Division of the Institute of Food Technologist renamed the Riester-Davis Award to include Aaron Brody's name in 2015 and now called the Riester-Davis-Brody Award.

He has been quoted in The New York Times, and featured on National Public Radio and CNN news. One of his NPR interviews was titled, The Weird, Underappreciated World Of Plastic Packaging where he explains that plastic packaging has become an ingrained part of the food system. On CNN, he described how new plastics may keep soft drinks from falling flat.

Books
Developing New Food Products for a Changing Marketplace, Second Edition (2000, with John B. Lord). Boca Raton, FL.  : CRC Press.
Modified Atmosphere Packaging for Fresh-Cut Fruits and Vegetables (2011, with Hong Zhuang and Jung H. Han). Oxford, UK.  : Wiley & Sons.
The Wiley Encyclopedia of Packaging Technology (1997, with Kenneth S. Marsh). New York.  : Wiley & Sons.
Active Packaging for Food Applications (2002, with Eugene R. Strupinsky and Lauri R. Kline). Boca Raton.  : CRC Press.
Principles of Package Development (1993, with Roger C. Griffin, Jr. and Stanley Sacharow). Malababar, FL.  : Krieger Publishing Company.

References

1930 births
2021 deaths
Massachusetts Institute of Technology alumni
Michigan State University faculty
University of Georgia faculty
United States Army soldiers
People from Gwinnett County, Georgia
People from Boston
English High School of Boston alumni
American food scientists
Fellows of the Institute of Food Technologists
Neurological disease deaths in Georgia (U.S. state)
Deaths from Alzheimer's disease
United States Army personnel of the Korean War